
Gmina Wolbrom (German: Wolfram) is an urban-rural gmina (administrative district) in Olkusz County, Lesser Poland Voivodeship, in southern Poland.

Villages
Apart from the town of Wolbrom, Gmina Wolbrom contains the villages and settlements of Boża Wola, Brzozówka, Budzyń, Chełm, Chrząstowice, Dłużec, Domaniewice, Gołaczewy, Jeżówka, Kaliś, Kąpiele Wielkie, Kąpiołki, Lgota Wielka, Lgota Wolbromska, Łobzów, Miechówka, Nowa Łąka, Okupniki, Podlesice Drugie, Poręba Dzierżna, Poręba Górna, Strzegowa, Sulisławice, Wierzchowisko, Wymysłów, Zabagnie, Załęże, Zarzecze and Zasępiec.

Neighbouring gminas
Gmina Wolbrom is bordered by the gminas of Charsznica, Gołcza, Klucze, Olkusz, Pilica, Trzyciąż and Żarnowiec.

References
 Polish official population figures 2006

Wolbrom
Olkusz County